The Lucius Clapp Memorial is a historic library building in Stoughton, Massachusetts.  The single story masonry Renaissance Revival structure was built in 1903.  It was Stoughton's first purpose-built library building, and was built on the site of its first schoolhouse.  The building was designed by Walter Atherton and given to the town by Lucius Clapp, a local schoolteacher and businessman.  It now houses the Stoughton Historical Society.

The building was listed on the National Register of Historic Places in 1992.

See also
National Register of Historic Places listings in Norfolk County, Massachusetts

References

External links

Stoughton Historical Society

Monuments and memorials on the National Register of Historic Places in Massachusetts
Libraries on the National Register of Historic Places in Massachusetts
Buildings and structures in Norfolk County, Massachusetts
Monuments and memorials in Massachusetts
Buildings and structures completed in 1903
Stoughton, Massachusetts
National Register of Historic Places in Norfolk County, Massachusetts